Bibinoi Hill is a group of volcanoes, located on Bacan island at the west side of Halmahera island, Indonesia. The volcano contains three andesitic stratovolcanoes. Two of them are called Songsu and Lansa.

See also 

 List of volcanoes in Indonesia

References 

Stratovolcanoes of Indonesia
Mountains of Indonesia
Holocene stratovolcanoes